Tornada may refer to:
Tornada (Occitan literary term)
Tornada e Salir do Porto, a parish in Portugal